Mara Bergman is an American children's author, poet and editor. Born in Bronx, New York, on leap year day, she grew up in Wantagh, Long Island, and attended Wantagh High School and the University of the State of New York at Oneonta, spending her third year studying at Goldsmiths College, London. Mara moved to England in 1983, and soon began to work for the children’s publisher Walker Books. When her three children, Marissa, Eva and Jonathan, were young she decided to start writing picture books, and her awards include the BookTrust Early Years Award and the Stockport Prize. In 2014, Mara won the Mslexia Poetry Pamphlet Prize and her collection The Tailor's Three Sons and Other New York Poems was published by Seren in 2015. Her first full collection, The Disappearing Room, was published in 2018 by Arc Publications. Her children's books have been translated into Finnish, French, German, Japanese, Korean and Hebrew.

Books

 Bears, Bears Everywhere, illustrated by Helen Craig Orchard Books, 1997
 Musical Beds, illustrated by  Simon & Schuster, 2002
 Glitter Kitty, illustrated by Lydia Monks Simon & Schuster,  2005
 Snip Snap!, illustrated by Nick Maland Hodder Children's Books, 2005
 Nick Mack’s Good Luck, illustrated by Jill Barton Walker Books, 2005
 Sylvie's Seahorse, illustrated by Tor Freeman Walker Books, 2006
 Oliver Who Would Not Sleep, illustrated by Nick Maland Hodder Children's Books, 2007
 Happy, illustrated by Simona Sanfilippo Evans Brothers, 2008
 Oliver Who Was Small But Mighty, illustrated by Nick Maland Hodder Children's Books, 2008
 Yum, Yum, illustrated by Nick Maland Hodder Children's Books, 2009
 Oliver Who Travelled Far and Wide, illustrated by Nick Maland Hodder Children's Books, 2009
 Lively Elizabeth, illustrated by Cassia Thomas Hodder Children's Books, expected 2010
 Oliver and the Noisy Baby, illustrated by Nick Maland Hodder Children's Books, 2011 
 Itchy Itch Itch, illustrated by Emily Bolam Bloomsbury Children's Books, 2012
 Best Friends, illustrated by Nicola Slater Hodder Children's Books, 2014
The Tailor's Three Sons and Other New York Poems, Seren, 2015
Crossing Into Tamil Nadu, Templar, 2015
The Disappearing Room, 2018
 The Tall Man and the Small Mouse, illustrated by Birgitta Sif, Walker Books, 2018

References

Living people
American children's writers
People from Wantagh, New York
American women children's writers
Year of birth missing (living people)
21st-century American women